Siyaah (Black) is a 2013 Pakistani horror thriller film directed by Azfar Jafri and written by Osman Khalid Butt. The film stars are Hareem Farooq, Qazi Jabbar, Mahnoor Usman and Ahmed Ali Akbar. The film is about the dissociative identity disorder.

Plot
Zara loses her child due to miscarriage. Bilal and Zara decide to adopt a child but they don't know  what is going to happen to them. Child they as adopt is a ghost. They will not know what is this either a personality disorder or a real ghost.

Cast 
 Hareem Farooq as Zara
 Qazi Jabbar Naeem as Bilal 
 Mahnoor Usman as Natasha
 Ahmed Ali Akbar as Faadi (Cameo Role)
 Aslam Rana
 Sofia Wanchoo Mir
 Rizwana
 Sarwar Salimi
 Amy Saleh
 Aqeel Abbas (CG)

Release 
Film teaser released on 15 June 2012 on YouTube.
The film released nationwide on 15 March 2013. Released by Cinepax and Footprint Entertainment, the film is rated U.

Accolades

References

External links 
 
 Official trailer on Vimeo
 

Pakistani horror films
2013 horror films
2013 films
2010s Urdu-language films
Pakistani independent films
Films directed by Azfar Jafri